Buran Voronezh is an ice hockey team in Voronezh, Russia. They play in the VHL, the second level of Russian ice hockey. It joined the league in 2012 and is currently affiliated with Dynamo Moscow of the KHL.

Notable players
 Yakov Rachinsky (1999–2000)
 Ivan Khlyntsev (2003–2004)
 Alexander Krysanov (2000–2004)
 Alexei Smirnov (2012–2013)

External links
Official site

Ice hockey teams in Russia
Sport in Voronezh
Ice hockey clubs established in 1949
1949 establishments in Russia